Phanodesta wakefieldi is a beetle of the family Trogossitidae, endemic to New Zealand. It was originally named Leperina wakefieldi, and has also been referred to as Lepidopteryx wakefieldi.

References

Beetles of New Zealand
Trogossitidae
Beetles described in 1877
Endemic fauna of New Zealand
Endemic insects of New Zealand